Tuyestan (also Romanized as Ţūyestān and Ţavīstān) is a village in Khvoresh Rostam-e Jonubi Rural District, Khvoresh Rostam District, Khalkhal County, Ardabil Province, Iran. At the 2006 census, its population was 268 in 56 families.

References 

Tageo

Towns and villages in Khalkhal County